Sermon on Mani's Teaching of Salvation is a Yuan dynasty silk hanging scroll, measuring 142 × 59 centimetres and dating from the 13th century, with didactic themes: a multi-scenic narrative that depicts Mani's Teachings about the Salvation combines a sermon subscene with the depictions of soteriological teaching in the rest of the painting.

The painting was regarded as a depiction of the six realms of saṃsāra by Japanese Buddhists, therefore it was called "Painting of the Six Paths of Rebirth". It was probably produced by a 13th-century painter from Ningbo, a city  in southern China, and is kept today in the Museum of Japanese Art Yamato Bunkakan in Nara, Nara.

Description 
The painting is divided into five scenes, with titles given by Zsuzsanna Gulácsi, a Hungarian specialist on Manichaeism.
 The Light Maiden's Visit to Heaven: the first section at the top depicts heaven as a palatial building that forms the focus of a narration of events with the repeated images of a few mythological beings: the Maiden of Light visiting the heaven. It shows on the left the greetings by the host of heaven upon the arrival of Maiden of Light, meeting with the host in the palace in the middle and the Maiden leaving heaven on the right.
 Sermon Around a Statue of Mani: the second scene is the main section and largest among the five, it depicts a sermon performed around the statue of a Manichaean deity (Mani) by two Manichaean elects dressing in white on the right. The elect giving the sermon is seated, while his assistant is standing. On the left seated the layman dressing in red and his attendant, listen to the sermon.
 States of Good Reincarnation: the third section is further divided into four small squares, each portraying one of four classes of Chinese society in order to capture what seems to be the daily life of the Chinese Manichaean laity. From left to right, the first scene represents itinerant labourers; the second, craftsmen; the third, farmers, and the fourth, aristocrats.

 The Light Maiden's Intervention in a Judgement: the fourth scene shows a judge seated behind a desk surrounded by his aides in a pavilion on an elevated platform, to the front of which two pairs of demons lead their captives to hear their fates. In the upper left corner, the Maiden of Light arrives on a cloud formation with two attendants, to intervene on behalf of the man about to be judged. This section is a depiction of the Manichaean view of judgement after death. The French historian Étienne de La Vaissière compared the judgement scene with that displayed on the Sogdian Wirkak's sarcophagus, and concluded that they are strikingly similar.
 States of Bad Reincarnation: the final scene depicting four fearful images of hell that include, from left to right, a demon shooting arrows at a person suspended from a red frame in the upper left corner; a person hung upside down and being dismembered by two demons; a fiery wheel rolled over a person; and lastly a group of demons waiting for their next victims.

Analysis 
Zsuzsanna Gulácsi states in her article A Visual Sermon on Mani's Teaching of Salvation: In the article "The Origin of the Manichaean "Hades Frame" in the Yamato Bunkakan Collection, Japan", Ma Xiaohe, a scholar specializing in Manichaeism, made a hypothetical reconstruction of the evolution of the image:

Gallery

Excursus 

Eight silk hanging scrolls with Manichaean didactic images from southern China from between the 12th and the 15th centuries, which can be divided into four categories:
 Two single portraits (depicting Mani and Jesus)
 Icon of Mani
 Manichaean Painting of the Buddha Jesus
 One scroll depicting Salvation Theory
 Sermon on Mani's Teaching of Salvation
 Four scrolls depicting Prophetology
 Mani's Parents
 Birth of Mani
 Episodes from Mani's Missionary Work
 Mani's Community Established
 One scroll depicting Cosmology
 Manichaean Diagram of the Universe

See also 
 Chinese Manichaeism

References 

Chinese Manichaean art
Chinese paintings
Religious paintings
13th-century paintings
Yuan dynasty